Michel Bouquet (6 November 1925 – 13 April 2022) was a French stage and film actor. He appeared in more than 100 films from 1947 to 2020. He won the Best Actor European Film Award for Toto the Hero in 1991 and two Best Actor Césars for How I Killed My Father (2001) and The Last Mitterrand (2005). He also received the Molière Award for Best Actor for Les côtelettes in 1998, then again for Exit the King in 2005. In 2014, he was awarded the Honorary Molière for the sum of his career. He received the Grand Cross of the Legion of Honor in 2018.

Biography
Michel François Pierre Bouquet was born on 6 November 1925 in Paris. When he was seven years old, he was sent to a boarding school where he stayed until the age of 14. He aspired to become a doctor but had to quit school at the age of 15 after his father had been taken prisoner during World War II. Bouquet worked as a baker's apprentice, then a bank clerk, to provide for the family. After a short stay in Lyon, he returned with his mother to Paris. Marie Bouquet was passionate about theater, and that helped the young Bouquet to find his vocation. He took acting classes under the tutelage of Maurice Escande, a member of the Comédie Française,  and made his stage debut in the play La première étape in 1944. Then he studied at the Conservatory of Dramatic Arts in Paris where he met Gérard Philippe.

Stage career

In the mid-1940s Michel Bouquet began working with the playwright Jean Anouilh and director André Barsacq, who staged plays at the Théâtre de l'Atelier in Montmartre. In 1946, Anouilh gave Bouquet a part in Roméo and Jeannette, followed by The Rendez-vous of Senlis and The Invitation to the Castle in 1947. In the 1950s, the actor met another stage director, Jean Vilar, with whom he would frequently collaborate. Bouquet played many roles from the classical repertoire at the Festival d'Avignon, created by Vilar in 1947 (Henry IV in 1950, The Tragedy of King Richard II in 1953, and The Miser in 1962). Bouquet regularly worked with Anouilh until the early 1970s, then helped popularize in France the works of the British author Harold Pinter: The Collection in 1965, The Birthday Party in 1967 and No Man's Land in 1979.

At the same time, at the end of the 1970s, Michel Bouquet was appointed professor at the National Conservatory of Dramatic Arts and taught there until 1990. In the 1980s-1990s, he returned to the Théâtre de l'Atelier where he once began his career. In 1994, he played in Exit the King by Eugene Ionesco, the role he would perform many times until 2014. In 1998 he received the Molière Award for Best Actor for Bertrand Blier’s Les côtelettes, then again for Exit the King in 2005. In 2014, he was awarded the Honorary Molière for the sum of his career. A year later, the actor received accolades for his performance in Taking Sides by the British playwright Ronald Harwood. Bouquet announced his retirement from stage in 2019.

Film career

Though Bouquet made his screen debut in 1947, his film career was slower to develop. In 1949, he appeared in Pattes blanches, adapted by Jean Anouilh from his own play and directed by Jean Grémillon, then in Henri-Georges Clouzot's Manon (1950) and Anouilh’s Deux sous de violettes (1951). Three years later, he acted in Abel Gance's historical melodrama La Tour de Nesle. In 1955, he narrated Alain Resnais' documentary Night and Fog. In 1965, he worked for the first time with director Claude Chabrol in Our Agent Tiger. Bouquet went on to act in several Chabrol films and received wide acclaim for his performances in The Unfaithful Wife, The Breach, and Just Before Nightfall.

With François Truffaut he shoots as Comolli, the private detective murdered by Jean-Paul Belmondo in Mississippi Mermaid (1969) and as one of the victims of Jeanne Moreau in The Bride Wore Black. For Chabrol he played the husband deceived by Stéphane Audran in The Unfaithful Wife, followed by Audran's wicked father-in-law in The Breach. Bouquet and Audran worked together in four Chabrol films. In the 1970s Bouquet is the obstinate cop who terrorized Alain Delon in Deux hommes dans la ville (1972), candidate for legislative elections in Defense de savoir (1973) by Nadine Trintignant, the hospitalized press boss who is surrounded by Claude Jade in Les Anneaux de Bicêtre (1976), but in the same year he was also the formidable billionaire in the comedy Le Jouet by Francis Veber. In this decade he played two dark roles for André Cayatte, in Il n'y a pas de fumée sans feu and La Raison d'État. Another film on the political subject is Plot by Yves Boisset. In the 1980s, he embodied a rotten notary and Stéphane Audran's enemy in Cop au Vin (1986), still with Chabrol. In 1982 he took on the role of Javert in Robert Hossein's adaptation of Les Miserables with Lino Ventura as Jean Valjean and Jean Carmet as Thénardier in 1984, and with such talent that many Hugolians consider this interpretation as the embodiment even by Javert.

Other works
Over the years, Bouquet recorded his readings of the works of Cervantes, Victor Hugo, Jean-Paul Sartre and other authors that were released on discs. An audio book of his readings of 13 selected fables of Jean de La Fontaine was released in 2019 to wide critical acclaim.

Personal life
Bouquet was married twice. His first wife was actress Ariane Borg, whom he divorced in 1967. His second wife is Juliette Carré, also an actress, who often shared the stage with him.

Bouquet died in Paris on 13 April 2022, at the age of 96.

Selected filmography

Awards and nominations

César Awards

European Film Award

Globes de Cristal Award

Molière Awards

Decorations
Bouquet was made Knight of the Legion of Honor in 1983, promoted to Officer in 1996, Commander in 2007, Grand Officer in 2013, and was awarded the Grand Cross of the Legion of Honor on 13 July 2018.

References

External links

1925 births
2022 deaths
20th-century French male actors
21st-century French male actors
European Film Award for Best Actor winners
Best Actor César Award winners
Best Actor Lumières Award winners
French male film actors
Male actors from Paris
French National Academy of Dramatic Arts alumni